Horacio Agulla (born October 22, 1984 in Buenos Aires) is an Argentine rugby union player, who plays for Castres Olympique at club level. He plays as a wing or fullback.

Horacio attended St. Felipe The Apostle School in Don Torcuato, a suburb in The Province of Buenos Aires. Agulla made his debut for the national side on December 3, 2005, in a match against Samoa. He was part of the Argentine squad for the 2007 Rugby World Cup which succeed in gaining Argentina's highest world cup finish of third place  and Argentine squad for the 2011 Rugby World Cup in New Zealand.

In 2008 he signed with Top 14's US Dax. He moved on to Brive in 2008. It was reported in early April 2010 (including on Sky Sports in the UK) that he had signed a contract to play for Leicester Tigers from the 2010/2011 season, joining his fellow Argentine internationals Marcos Ayerza and Lucas González Amorosino at Welford Road. In June 2012, he left Leicester and signed a contract with Bath Rugby.

Horacio was part of the Argentina squad that competes in the Rugby Championship.

References

External links
 Leicester Tigers profile
 UAR profile
 Profile at scrum.com
  Clarin.com

1984 births
Living people
Argentine rugby union players
Rugby union wings
People from Buenos Aires
Rugby union players from Buenos Aires
Hindú Club players
Leicester Tigers players
Bath Rugby players
US Dax players
CA Brive players
Argentina international rugby union players
Argentine expatriate rugby union players
Argentine expatriate sportspeople in France
Argentine expatriate sportspeople in England
Expatriate rugby union players in France
Expatriate rugby union players in England
Argentina international rugby sevens players
Male rugby sevens players